Bellett is an English surname. Notable people with the surname include:

 John Gifford Bellett (1795–1864), Irish writer and theologian
 Wally Bellett (born 1933), English footballer
 James Bellett Richey (1834–1902), British politician

See also 
 Isuzu Bellett, subcompact car produced by the Japanese manufacturer Isuzu
 Isuzu Bellett Gemini, subcompact car 
 Bellet
 Belet

English-language surnames